Cesária is the fifth album by Cesária Évora.  The album, consisting of Cape Verdean morna and coladeira songs, was released by Paris-based Lusafrica on 18 July 1995.  The album was nominated for a Grammy Award in the World Music category in 1996.

It was certified gold in France by SNEP which sold more than 100,000 copies. As of 1997, in United States the album has sold 150,000 copies.

Track listing
Selected translations: "Tudo dia e dia" is "Everyday, Everyday"," Flor na Paul" is "Flower of Paul" and "Doce Guerra" is "Sweet War".

Charts

Certifications and sales

Credits

Group members
 Cesária Évora -  singer
 Paulino Vieira - bass guitar, cavaquinho, piano, harmonica, percussions, chorus
 Osvaldo Dias - cord guitar, chorus
 Armando Tito - guitar, chorus
 Toy Vieira  - cavaquinho, chorus
 Raúl Barboza - accordion
 Ramiro Mendes, Teofilo Chantre - chorus

Technical team and production
Producer: José da Silva
Producer, arrangements: Paulino Vieira
Engineers: Christian Echaïb, Didier Le Marchand, Gérard Kouchtchouian
Mixers: Christian Echaïb, Paulino Vieira
Artwork: Le Village, Christian Libessart
Photographer: Ernest Collins, Pierre René-Worms

Earlier album
Also there was an earlier album released by herself titled Cesária which was and LP album released on Discos Mindelo in 1987.  Tito Paris was the guitarist, keyboardist and vocals and Luís Morais with the clarinet.

Cover version
The first track Petit Pays which was re-recorded by Nantes-based Hocus Group on their album Place 54 (2007) and titled "Quitte à t'aimer où" which was made by flutist Malik Mezzadri

References

External links

1995 albums
Cesária Évora albums